Hu Daoliang is a Chinese wheelchair fencer. He represented China at the Summer Paralympics in 2004, 2008, 2012 2016 and 2020 and in total he won seven gold medals, four silver medals and one bronze medal. He has won fifteen medals (9 Gold) at the World Championships.

References

External links 
 

Living people
Year of birth missing (living people)
Place of birth missing (living people)
Chinese male épée fencers
Wheelchair fencers at the 2004 Summer Paralympics
Wheelchair fencers at the 2008 Summer Paralympics
Wheelchair fencers at the 2012 Summer Paralympics
Wheelchair fencers at the 2016 Summer Paralympics
Wheelchair fencers at the 2020 Summer Paralympics
Medalists at the 2004 Summer Paralympics
Medalists at the 2008 Summer Paralympics
Medalists at the 2012 Summer Paralympics
Medalists at the 2016 Summer Paralympics
Medalists at the 2020 Summer Paralympics
Paralympic gold medalists for China
Paralympic silver medalists for China
Paralympic bronze medalists for China
Paralympic medalists in wheelchair fencing
Paralympic wheelchair fencers of China
Chinese male foil fencers
21st-century Chinese people